Settat is a city in Morocco between the national capital Rabat and Marrakesh. It is the capital of Settat Province and is its largest city in both size and population. According to the 2014 Moroccan census, it had a population of 142,250 people, up from 116,570 people in the 2004 census. The antiquities of Settat include the very old Ismailiya Kasbah distinguished by the statue of a steed which lies at the center of the city.

Etymology
The name Settat comes from "Ayt Settat" a Senhaja-Berber clan of the Houara tribe.  They belonged to the Masmuda-led Almohad alliance according to al-Baydaq, Ibn Hazm and Ibn Khaldun. Their origin is south-east of the High-Atlas and they seemingly settled in the Chaouia region as a result of the Almohad advance to the north.

History
By choosing to build the Kasbah on the hilly site of Settat, 18th century Moroccan ruler Moulay Ismail would trigger the process of urbanization. Indeed, the building of the Kasbah brought order and security for travelers and residents supported the settlements near it. Moreover, by installing the first Caïd in the region which previously depended Caïd Doukkali and Rahmani, Moulay Ismail formalized Settat status as capital of this region.

Settat became an administrative center in the early 18th century, due to its strategic position as an unavoidable passage between North and South. Thanks to the richness of the soil, it also prospered during the 18th and 19th centuries as an important trading center for agricultural products, attracting entrepreneurs. This was the case for Moroccan Jews who settled here en masse in the 19th century, building their own neighborhood, the Mellah, near the Kasbah.

This development was disrupted in the early 20th century during the early chaos of the French colonization when the Chaouia tribes rallied to Moulay Hafid. However, under the French protectorate, the city of Settat had unprecedented urban development, as evidenced by the population boom it experienced from 1913 to 1925. This prosperity lasted until the early fifties when, as a result of the development of Casablanca, communications, and transportation, the city of Settat and other towns in the region have entered a period of semi-lethargy.

In the early 1990s, Settat was endowed with a university L’Université Hassan 1er de Settat, an international golf course, and a racetrack. Settat has undergone large-scale urban planning from the 1970s to become an important regional center. Settat is linked to Casablanca ( to the north) since 2001 by the A7 highway, and Marrakech ( to the south) since 2007.

Cities and Towns of Settat's region 

0.Ben Ahmed

Berrechid
Deroua
El Borouj
El Gara
Guisser
Loulad
Oulad Abbou
Oulad H Riz Sahel
Oulad M'Rah
Oulad Said
Ras El Ain
Settat
Sidi Rahhal Chatai
Soualem

Notable people
 David Amar (1920-2000), Moroccan Jewish businessman
 Jo Amar (1930-2009), Moroccan-Jewish singer
 Driss Basri (1938-2007), Minister of the Interior under Hassan II
 Bouchaib Benlabsir (1931-1991), deputy mayor of settat city
 Abdellah Bendhaiba (1950-), Former Wali of Doukkala-Abda, Governor (Khouribga, Nador, Taroudant) and Parliamentarian (Settat)
 Habib Mazini, novelist
 Mohamed Moâtassim (1956-), adviser to King Mohammed VI
 Ahmed Nejmeddine (1962-), President of the Hassan 1st University of Settat.
 Abdel Abqar, footballer
 Yahya Jabrane, footballer

Sister cities
  Burgos, Castile and León, Spain.
  Tours, France.
  La Celle Saint Cloud, France

Gallery

References

Populated places in Settat Province
Municipalities of Morocco
Cities in Morocco
Provincial capitals in Morocco